Aakash Chopra  (born 19 September 1977) is a cricket commentrator, youtuber and former Cricketer who played for the Indian cricket team from 2003 to late 2004. 

Currently, he is doing Hindi cricket commentary for Viacom18. He worked as a column writer for ESPNcricinfo. 

His international cricket career was very short. He played 10 test matches and scored 437 runs with an average of 23.

In Indian domestic cricket, he played for Delhi cricket team, Himachal Pradesh cricket team and Rajasthan cricket team. He has played for Kolkata Knight Riders in the Indian Premier League.

Cricket career

International
Chopra made his Test debut in Ahmedabad against New Zealand in late 2003 as India sought to find an opening partner for his Delhi teammate Virender Sehwag. Chopra's international career started well, scoring two half-centuries against New Zealand during 2003–04 in the second Test in Mohali. On the 2003–04 tour to Australia, he featured in many solid partnerships with Virender Sehwag, including two century opening partnerships in Melbourne and Sydney. Chopra's work in seeing off the new ball saw him credited with the large scores that India accumulated in that series when middle-order batsmen Rahul Dravid, V. V. S. Laxman, Sachin Tendulkar and Sourav Ganguly regularly compiled large centuries.

On the subsequent tour to Pakistan, he compiled another century stand with Virender Sehwag as India posted more than 600 runs in the first innings to set up a heavy innings defeat of arch-rivals Pakistan in the first Test in Multan. However, in the second Test, the Indian batsmen failed in a losing effort, apart from a century from Yuvraj Singh, who played in place of the injured captain Sourav Ganguly. When Ganguly returned for the final Test, Chopra was axed and Yuvraj was retained.

Chopra was reintroduced as Sehwag's partner in the 2004 Border-Gavaskar Trophy after Tendulkar was injured for the First Test in Bangalore. However, a heavy loss saw Chopra axed for the following match in Chennai upon Tendulkar's return, with Yuvraj elevated to opening the innings. Yuvraj also struggled, and Chopra was recalled for the Third Test in Nagpur. However, a double failure by Chopra, as Australia won a series in India for the first time in 35 years, saw him drop for the last time, after his career average gradually decreased, however, from 46.25 to only 23. Chopra was replaced by Delhi teammate Gautam Gambhir, and was overtaken by Gambhir and Wasim Jaffer in the race to partner Sehwag on the Test side. Due to his low scoring rate, he was not considered for One Day Internationals.

IPL
He played for Kolkata Knight Riders in IPL 2008, IPL 2009, but was dropped eventually as he was deemed too slow for fast paced T-20 cricket.

In IPL 2011 he had been signed by Rajasthan Royals, in that season he scored just 53 runs with a poor average of 8.83 in 6 innings. After that, he did not get a chance to play even a single match in 2 years. Eventually, he announced his retirement from all forms of cricket in 2015.

Domestic
In September 2008, Aakash played for Delhi in the Nissar Trophy against SNGPL (winners of Quaid-i-Azam Trophy from Pakistan) and scored 4 and 197 for Delhi. The match was drawn but SNGPL won the trophy on first-innings lead. After representing Delhi for a long time, Chopra joined Rajasthan as a guest player in Ranji Plate division. He helped Rajasthan to become the first Plate division team to win the Ranji Trophy followed by another Ranji trophy win in 2010–2011 season. He has won three Ranji titles in total—one with Delhi and two with Rajasthan. He's one of the few Indian cricketers who have scored over 8,000 First-Class runs.

Cricket commentary career
He did television commentary for Star Sports for a long time. His cricket commentary style is similar to Navjot Singh Sidhu. In commentary he use lots of one liner, rhymes. For every player, shot and situation he have one liners and short poems. He also use word play and idioms amid Hindi live TV commentary. Chopra have tendency to repeat lines, often same lines for different players with a set tune. Often fans criticize his commentary.

Amid 2018–19 Australia versus India test series, he did commentary for 7 Network, also lent voice for commentary on Sony Ten 2. 

In January 2023, he left Star Sports, joined Viacom 18 network, and began doing Hindi commentry for them on Sports 18 and Jio Cinema app in South African Twenty20 league, SA20.

Other media
His columns regularly appear in Mid-Day and on Cricinfo.

In 2009 Chopra released Beyond the Blues: A First-Class Season Like No Other, a diary of Chopra's 2007–08 domestic season. It was published by HarperCollins. It was critically acclaimed and Suresh Menon of Cricinfo wrote that it was "the best book written by an Indian Test cricketer". In November 2011, his second book was published by HarperCollins titled Out of the Blue, about Rajasthan's victory in the Ranji Trophy. He went on to write two more books—The Insider with Espn Cricinfo in 2015 and Numbers Do Lie with Impact Index in 2017. HarperCollins has published all his work thus far.

In May 2020, Aakash Chopra signed as a commentator with popular mobile cricket game World Cricket Championship to lend his voice for the upcoming WCC3 game. Aakash Chopra was the first commentator to sign as commentator with a digital game platform.
Aakash Chopra also has a YouTube channel where 
he uploads match review and previews.

References

External links 
 

1977 births
Punjabi Hindus
Punjabi people
Living people
India Test cricketers
North Zone cricketers
Delhi cricketers
Kolkata Knight Riders cricketers
Marylebone Cricket Club cricketers
Himachal Pradesh cricketers
Rajasthan cricketers
Central Zone cricketers
Sportspeople from Agra
Indian cricket commentators
Rajasthan Royals cricketers
Indian Premier League cricketers
Star Sports
Indian YouTubers
YouTube channels launched in 2011